Photinia prionophylla is a species in the family Rosaceae of flowering plants.

References

prionophylla